Bibi Ayesha is a military leader and the only known female warlord in Afghanistan. She controls a force of 50-150 men in the Nahrin district of Baghlan Province. Also known as Kaftar ("The Pigeon"), she operated for at least two decades, fighting against Soviet troops and then the Taliban militia as part of Jamiat-e Islami.

She dismissed notions that the roles of women in Afghanistan should exclude military roles, saying "It makes no difference if you are a man or a woman when you have the heart of a fighter." However, she does insist that a mahram male relative, accompany her into battle.

On 18 October 2020, Ayesha came under attack by the Taliban, a day after they claimed that she had defected to them.

See also
Afghan National Army
Khatool Mohammadzai
Latifa Nabizada
Niloofar Rahmani
Women's rights in Afghanistan

References

External links
Ayesha: Afghanistan's Only Female Warlord

Year of birth missing (living people)
Living people
Mujahideen members of the Soviet–Afghan War
Hazara military personnel
Afghan warlords
People from Baghlan Province
Women in 21st-century warfare
Women in war in South Asia